Rhett & Link's Buddy System (also known as Buddy System) is an American series produced exclusively for YouTube Premium, created by, written by and starring comedy duo Rhett McLaughlin and Link Neal. The series premiered with episodes one and two being released on October 19, 2016, on Rhett and Link's Good Mythical Morning channel. The season 1 finale was released on November 30, 2016. On November 29, 2017, all episodes of Season 2 were released on the same day. In November 2019, every episode was made free to watch on the Good Mythical Morning YouTube channel.

Season 1 of Buddy System features guest stars Page Kennedy and Leslie Bibb, starring as high school friends of Rhett and Link. After Link's phone is stolen by Aimee Brells (Leslie Bibb) they undertake a wild range of events battling to return it, while Aimee Brells, the Infomercial Queen, is attempting to take over the Good Mythical Morning channel as her own.

Season 2 of Buddy System shows a fictitious version of Rhett and Link in an alternate universe, where Rhett McLaughlin is a professional food tester, and Link Neal is lonely and just fired. They meet for the first time when Rhett is looking for an illegal roommate. They learn how to get on with each other, through the ups and downs, and come out together on the other side.

Premise
Season 1 begins with Rhett and Link's quest to regain control of their famous morning talk-show Good Mythical Morning and the channel it is uploaded to from Aimee Brells (Leslie Bibb), an infomercial star, who is using the channel to upload informercials for a variety of very strange products, and gained access to the channel by stealing Link's lost phone. Season 2 revolves around the concept of Rhett and Link's friendship, had it never existed prior.

Cast

Main
 Rhett McLaughlin as himself
 Link Neal as himself
 Page Kennedy as Maxwell
 Leslie Bibb as Aimee Brells

Recurring
 Mario Revolori as Mandip
 Lauren Powers as Bodyguard
 Adam Gregor as George
 Tobias Jelinek as Dylan
 Jenna Bryant as Magician's Assistant
 Molly Shannon as Rhonda
 Chris Parnell as Vampire Magician
 Tyler Kaplan as Link, age 10
 Talia Dillingham as Roberto
 Tony Hale as Glen
 Garrett Morris as Ignatius
 Alison Rich as Vanessa

Episodes

Season 1 (2016)

Season 2 (2017)

Production
The duo officially announced the show on June 23, 2016. Upon release, the show was a success, with the free-to-view premiere episode currently having 14.3 million views. Variety reported in March 2017 that the show was the "number 1 digital series in the US."

So far, two seasons, each with eight episodes, have been released. On May 8, 2017, Rhett and Link announced on the Good Mythical Morning episode "2 Month Old Burrito (EXPERIMENT)" that the series has been renewed for a second season. Shooting of season 2 took place for seven weeks throughout summer 2017, with the episodes expected to be released later in the year.

On November 16, 2017, Rhett and Link released the trailer for Buddy System season 2. The second season was released November 29, 2017.

Accolades

References

External links

'Rhett and Link's Buddy System' on YouTube Red
Q&A: YouTube Stars Rhett & Link on Their New Comedy Series 'Buddy System'

YouTube Premium original series
2016 web series debuts